Roland Mahauden (21 October 1942 – 9 November 2018) was a Belgian actor, filmmaker, and stage director.

Biography
Mahauden collaborated with actress Isabelle Paternotte in 1999 to create a project called Article 27 to help poorer members of society can access cultural events under the leadership of Centres d'aide sociale and the French Community Commission (COCOF).

Beginning in 2004, Mahauden helped theatrical awareness campaigns for the Democratic Republic of the Congo, such as Tous en scène pour la paix (All on stage for peace), which highlights the problem of child soldiers in developing nations and reintegration of the children into their families, and  Un enfant c’est pas sorcier (A child is not a sorcerer), which highlights the problems of witchcraft accusations by churches. He showed these performances at Théâtre de Poche, which he owned up until his death.

Stage performances
At the Théâtre Banlieue

Deathwatch by Jean Genet
Remember Me by Michel Tremblay

At the Théâtre de Poche

Sister Mary Ignatius Explains It All For You by Christopher Durang
The Art of Love by Ovid (adapted by Michel Grodent)
L'Apocalypse de Saint-Jean, translated into modern French by Gaston Compère
Pétition by Václav Havel
Greek by Steven Berkoff
Mort de Noël by Franz Xaver Kroetz
Satires by Juvenal
Smack ! by Herman Wolf
L'Argent du Ministre by Philippe Blasband
Paroles by Pierre Desproges
Bouches décousues by Jasmine Dubé
Death and the Maiden by Ariel Dorfman
Le Sens du partage by Riton Liebman
Commune à facilités by the author of the 2003 show Contes urbains
No Man's Land by Danis Tanovic
Allah Superstar by Y.B.

At the Délégation Générale Wallonie-Bruxelles

Broken Glass by Alain Mabanckou

Filmography
The Lonely Killers by Boris Szulzinger (1972)

References

1942 births
2018 deaths
Belgian male actors
Belgian directors
People from Etterbeek